The Digital Theft Deterrence and Copyright Damages Improvement Act of 1999 is a United States law that increased the possible civil penalties for copyright infringement.

It also attempted to clear an administrative hurdle that was preventing the United States Sentencing Commission from implementing the NET Act of 1997's increased criminal penalties for similar offenses.

Details
The range of allowable statutory damages in civil actions for copyright infringement was established by a previous act as a minimum of $500 per work, and a maximum of either $20,000 or $100,000 per work, depending on whether the infringement was "willful." The new legislation increased these amounts by 50%, changing the minimum to $750, and the maximums to $30,000 and $150,000.

Rationale
When introducing an earlier version of the bill in the House of Representatives, Rep. Howard Coble 
(R-NC) stated that widespread use of the Internet and the advent of high-capacity storage media like the DVD had the potential to worsen the problem of disregard for copyright, so increased penalties were needed to more strongly deter infringement.

This rationale was cited in the Sony BMG v. Tenenbaum case, which, among other things, unsuccessfully sought to challenge the fairness of the statutory damage range.

When introducing a new version of the bill in the House, Rep. Coble stated that it "provides an inflation adjustment" in order "to provide meaningful disincentives for infringement, and to accomplish that, the cost of infringement must substantially exceed the cost of the compliance so that those who use or distribute intellectual property have incentive to comply with the law."

After the bill passed the Senate, Sen. Patrick Leahy (D-VT) said that the increase would help deter digital copyright infringement, especially software piracy.

References

External links
 

United States copyright law
Acts of the 106th United States Congress